The Hermosa Bungalow Historic District is a historic district on the National Register of Historic Places in the Hermosa community area on the northwest side of Chicago. The district is roughly bounded by W. Belmont Avenue to the north, N. Lowell Avenue to the east, W. Diversey Avenue to the south, and N. Kolmar Avenue to the west. The district's contributing properties include 298 bungalows, 15 brick multi-unit apartment buildings, 8 brick two-flats, 3 garages, and Barry Elementary School.

On December 31, 2018, the Hermosa Bungalow Historic District Chicago was added to the National Register of Historic Places. It was the 13th such Chicago district to be added to the Register.

References

External links
 Chicago Bungalow Association

West Side, Chicago
Residential buildings on the National Register of Historic Places in Chicago
Historic districts on the National Register of Historic Places in Illinois
Historic districts in Chicago